Come Home (released 2009 on the Heilo catalog by the Grappa label - HCD 7244) is a studio album by the couple  Annbjørg Lien and Bjørn Ole Rasch.

Review 
On this album the Norwegian traditional musician and Hardanger fiddle virtuoso Annbjørg Lien teams up with her husband, foot bellows organist Bjørn Ole Rasch, for a wonderful and eclectic album featuring Hardanger fiddle, harmonium and contemporary and fresh versions of traditional music. With distinct compositions and performances, and a wide range of musical influences, they continue breaking musical boundaries.

Reception
The review by the Norwegian newspaper Aftenposten awarded the album dice 5, and the review by the Norwegian newspaper Dagbladet also awarded the album dice 5.

Track listing 
"Funk Trunk" (4:08)
"Jo The Gigant" (4:29)
"Come Home" (3:25)
"The Goblin's Halling/The Buckin' Mule" (3:22)
"Kongshavn" (2:55)
"Woody's Bounce" (3:32)
"The Old Car" (4:09)
"Phelia/January" (7:14)
"Roquebrune" (4:39)
"Hässleholm" (3:58)
"The Little Goblin" (3:39)

Personnel 
Annbjørg Lien – Hardingfele, fiddle, keyed fiddle and vocals
Bjørn Ole Rasch - foot bellows organ, harmonium and vocals

Credits 
Mastering – Roald Råsberg
Mixing – Trond Engebretsen
Recording – Trond Engebretsen

Notes 
Recorded and mixed at Kongshavn Studios in Kristiansand, Norway

References 

2009 albums
Annbjørg Lien albums